David Thomson (1914 – 1988) was a writer and BBC radio producer.

Early life
David Robert Alexander Thomson was born in British colonial India to Scottish parents. His father served in the Indian Army and was wounded in the Great War. As a child, Thomson lived in Scotland, as well as in Derbyshire and London, where he attended University College School. At the age of eleven, he sustained an eye injury which nearly blinded him. Unable to continue at school, he was sent to the home of his maternal grandmother in Nairn, Scotland, where he was taught by private tutors. At fourteen, Thomson returned to London and the progressive King Alfred School, London to complete his schooling. As an undergraduate he studied Modern History at Lincoln College, Oxford. At this time he also started to tutor a daughter of an Anglo-Irish family, the Kirkwoods, at Woodbrook House in County Roscommon, Ireland.

Career
From 1943 to 1969, Thomson worked for the BBC as a writer and producer of radio documentaries. Many of these programmes, which covered a range of topics in natural history of peoples and places also found a place in his written work, for example The People of the Sea (1954), on the lore and life of the grey seal in the coastal rural communities of Ireland and Scotland. In 1953-4 he was seconded to UNESCO to produce radio programmes in France, Liberia and Turkey. In 1952, David Thomson married Martina Mayne. They had three sons.

Among his most notable works are three memoirs: Woodbrook (1974), reflecting a ten-year period from 1932 when he visited Ireland regularly, tutoring Phoebe Kirkwood; In Camden Town (1983), describing his life and neighbours in London in the 1950s and 60's; and Nairn in Darkness and Light (1987), where he revisits his childhood years spent in his mother's mother's home in Scotland. In each of these books, his fine style, elegiac but never sentimental, incorporates vivid historical sketches. His acute and sympathetic approach in seeking the voice of the 'common man', whether in an urban or a rural setting, recalls the poetic documentary approach pioneered in film by John Grierson.

Bibliography
The People of the Sea (non-fiction), 1954
Daniel (novel), 1962
Break in the Sun (novel), 1965
Danny Fox (children's story), 1966
Danny Fox meets a stranger (children's story), 1968
The Leaping Hare (non fiction with George Ewart Evans), 1972, 'another classic beast-book'.
Woodbrook (memoir), 1974 
Danny Fox at the Palace (children's story), 1976
The Irish Journals of Elizabeth Smith; 1840–1850.
In Camden Town (memoir), 1983.
Dandiprat's Days (novel), 1983
Ronan and other stories (children's stories), 1984
Nairn in Darkness and Light (memoir), 1987. Awarded the McVitie's Prize for Scottish writer of the year in 1987, and (posthumously) the NCR Book Award for nonfiction in 1988.

Thomson's papers, including BBC scripts and correspondence, are collected in the National Library of Scotland Archive.

References

1914 births
1988 deaths
BBC people